UTC+09:00 is an identifier for a time offset from UTC of +09:00.

During the Japanese occupations of British Borneo, Burma, Hong Kong, Dutch East Indies, Malaya, Philippines, Singapore, and French Indochina, it was used as a common time with Tokyo until the fall of the Empire of Japan.

As standard time (year-round)
Principal cities: Tokyo, Chikusei, Yokohama, Fukuoka, Hiroshima, Seoul, Pyongyang, Yakutsk, Koror, Dili, Jayapura, Ambon

North Asia
Russia – Yakutsk Time 
Far Eastern Federal District
Amur Oblast, Sakha Republic (western part; west of the Lena River as well as territories adjacent to the Lena on the eastern side)
Zabaykalsky Krai

East Asia
Japan – Japan Standard Time
North Korea – Time in North Korea
South Korea – Korea Standard Time

Oceania

Micronesia 
Palau

Southeast Asia
East Timor – Time in East Timor
Indonesia – Eastern Indonesia Time
Eastern zone, including: 
Maluku Islands
Maluku
North Maluku
Western New Guinea
Papua 
West Papua

Discrepancies between official UTC+09:00 and geographical UTC+09:00

Areas in UTC+09:00 longitudes using other time zones 
This concerns areas within 127°30′ E and 142°30′ E longitude.

China

 Parts of Northeast China, including eastern half of Heilongjiang Province and Yanbian Korean Autonomous Prefecture in Jilin Province, where UTC+08:00 is used.

Australia

 The easternmost parts of Western Australia where UTC+08:00 is used, Eucla and nearby areas where (unofficial) UTC+08:45 is used. 

 The Northern Territory, where UTC+09:30 is used, and South Australia and Broken Hill where UTC+09:30 and DST UTC+10:30 are used, respectively, despite the borders of the territory and state fitting perfectly within the ideal meridians of UTC+09:00.

 The western parts of Queensland where UTC+10:00 is used, and westernmost parts of Victoria and New South Wales where UTC+10:00 and UTC+11:00 in summer time, is used.

Federated States of Micronesia

Parts of Federated States of Micronesia, including western parts of Yap State, where UTC+10:00 is used.

Papua New Guinea

The very westernmost parts of Papua New Guinea, where UTC+10:00 is used.

Russia

Parts of Russia, including Jewish Autonomous Oblast, Primorsky Krai, central part of Sakha, and most of Khabarovsk Krai where UTC+10:00 is used, and westernmost parts of eastern Sakha Republic and Sakhalin Island, where UTC+11:00 is used.

Areas outside UTC+09:00 longitudes using UTC+09:00 time

Areas between 97°30′ E and 112°30′ E ("physical" UTC+07:00) 
Russia
 A westernmost part of Sakha Republic, including the urban localities Aykhal and Udachny

Areas between 112°30′ E and 127°30′ E ("physical" UTC+08:00) 
Russia
 Zabaykalsky Krai
Most of western Sakha Republic
East Timor
Indonesia
The western islands in the provinces of Maluku and North Maluku (from south to north):
Liran Island
Wetar Island
Kisar Island
Ambelau Island
Buru Island
Sanana Island
Mangole Island
Taliabu and surrounding islands
 Papua
Japan
 Parts of Okinawa Prefecture:
Sakishima Islands
Yaeyama Islands
Miyako Islands
Okinawa Islands
Kume Island
Aguni Islands
The western parts of Kerama Islands
North Korea
 The western parts of Korea, including the capital city, Pyongyang
South Korea
 The western parts of Korea, including the capital city, Seoul

Areas between 142°30′ E and 157°30′ E ("physical" UTC+10:00) 
Japan
The eastern parts of Hokkaido, including Obihiro, Kushiro, and Nemuro
Minami-Tori-shima in Ogasawara municipality
Russia
 New Siberian Islands 
Novaya Sibir 
Faddeyevsky Island
A smaller part of Kotelny Island 
The eastern part of Great Lyakhovsky Island

See also
Time in Russia
Time in North Korea
Time in South Korea
Japan Standard Time
Time in Indonesia
Time in East Timor

References

External links

UTC offsets
Time in Japan
Time in South Korea
Time in Indonesia
Time in Southeast Asia